Nathan Jerome Chatoyer Butler-Oyedeji (born 4 January 2003) is an English professional footballer who plays as a striker for Accrington Stanley, on loan from Arsenal.

Career
Born in London, Butler-Oyedeji joined Arsenal at the age of 8, turning professional in 2021. He spent time training with the Arsenal first team, before moving on loan to Accrington Stanley in January 2023.

References

2003 births
Living people
English footballers
Arsenal F.C. players
Accrington Stanley F.C. players
English Football League players
Association football forwards
Black British sportspeople